The Spider is a 1916 American drama silent film directed by Robert G. Vignola, written by William Clifford, and starring Pauline Frederick, Thomas Holding and Frank Losee. It was released on January 27, 1916, by Paramount Pictures.

Plot
A French woman abandons her husband and child. Years later the child and mother both fall in love with the same artist, even though they don't know who each other are.

Cast 
Pauline Frederick as Valerie St. Cyr / Joan Marche
Thomas Holding as Julian St. Saens
Frank Losee as Count Du Poissy

References

External links 
 

1916 films
1910s English-language films
Silent American drama films
1916 drama films
Paramount Pictures films
Films directed by Robert G. Vignola
American black-and-white films
American silent feature films
1910s American films